The 2018 Formula Renault Northern European Cup was the thirteenth and the final Formula Renault Northern European Cup season, an open-wheel motor racing series. It was a multi-event motor racing championship that featured drivers competing in 2 litre Formula Renault single seat race cars that conform to the technical regulations for the championship.

The championship title was won by German driver Doureid Ghattas, after recording five consecutive win. He won races at Hungaroring, Nürburgring and Hockenheim, finished 42 points clear of his closest rival and Anders Motorsport teammate, Phil Hill, who was the winner at Spa and Hockenheim. Third place in the championship was settled by R-ace GP driver Gabriel Gandulia, who finished eight points behind Hill. Sharon Scolari was the last driver considered as regular driver finished fourth.

Over the course of the season, four different drivers won a race. Aside from Ghattas and Hill, other drivers (when they were eligible for the series trophy) to win were Logan Sargeant, who finished fifth in the championship, and his teammate Victor Martins. Alex Peroni, who finished seventh was the only driver excluding Ghattas and Hill, who was able to win more than one race.

Teams and drivers

Calendar and results
The provisional calendar for the 2018 season was announced on 11 November 2017. The schedule was increased to six rounds. For the first time in the history, the series is scheduled to have event which will be part of the Pau Grand Prix. Hungaroring and Circuit Park Zandvoort were set to return to the calendar, while events at Nürburgring and Silverstone Circuit were set to be omitted. On 4 April 2018 the calendar was amended, with three rounds supporting 2018 Eurocup Formula Renault 2.0. Zandvoort opener was replaced by Nürburgring in the schedule. On 31 August 2018 the final round at Hockenheimring was rescheduled to an earlier date.

Championship standings
Points system
Points were awarded to the top 20 classified finishers.

Drivers' championship

Teams' championship

Footnotes

References

External links
 Official website of the Formula Renault 2.0 NEC championship

NEC
Formula Renault 2.0 NEC
Renault NEC